Isognomon perna, the brown purse shell, is a bivalve in the family Isognomonidae common in the Indo-Pacific including Hawaii.

References

Pteriida
Molluscs of the Pacific Ocean